Timothy Wayne Maypray II (May 13, 1988 – January 15, 2019) was an American professional gridiron football wide receiver.  He most recently played for the Ottawa Redblacks of the Canadian Football League.  Prior to playing for Ottawa, he was with the Montreal Alouettes, also of the Canadian Football League (CFL).  Maypray returned kicks for the Alouettes during the 2010 season.  During his CFL debut against the Saskatchewan Roughriders, Maypray returned a missed field goal 125 yards for a touchdown.

Playing career

Amateur
Maypray played his high school football at Randolph-Macon Academy in Front Royal, Virginia.  He was a two-time letterman in football and basketball.

Maypray played college football at Virginia Military Institute (VMI) where he played several different positions (wide receiver, running back and quarterback) and returned kicks.  During his four-year career at VMI, Maypray scored 39 touchdowns.  Maypray was named the 2006 Big South Freshman of the Year.  He was named First Team All Big South at kick returner, and Second Team All Big South at wide receiver after his sophomore season.  Heading into the 2009 season, Maypray received several pre-season honours including being named to the Big South Football Conference Pre-Season All Conference Team at both quarterback and as a punt returner.  He was also voted the 2009 Big South Pre-Season Offensive Player of the Year.

Professional
Maypray made his professional debut with the Montreal Alouettes of the Canadian Football League (CFL) during the 2010 season.  During his first game, Maypray returned a missed field goal by Luca Congi of the Saskatchewan Roughriders 125 yards for a touchdown, setting a team record.  During the Alouettes next meeting against the Roughriders, Maypray returned another missed field goal 118 yards for a touchdown.  After his second missed field goal return for a touchdown, Maypray was named the CFL's Special Teams Player of the Week.

Off Season
During the off season of the CFL, Maypray worked at his old high school, Randolph-Macon Academy.

Personal life
While at VMI, Maypray also played on the basketball team.  He majored in psychology.

Maypray died on January 15, 2019.

References

1988 births
2019 deaths
Montreal Alouettes players
VMI Keydets football players
People from Madisonville, Kentucky
Players of American football from Kentucky
Place of death missing
African-American players of Canadian football
Ottawa Redblacks players
20th-century African-American people
21st-century African-American sportspeople